Interior of a Studio in Paris (Swedish - Ateljéinteriör i Paris) is an 1886 oil on canvas painting by Eva Bonnier, measuring 41 by 32 cm and showing a sculpture of a young boy in her studio on Rue Humboldt in Montparnasse - she lived in the French capital from 1883 to 1889. It is in the collection of the Nationalmuseum in Stockholm, to which it was given in 1910 by Karl Otto Bonnier.

Paintings in the collection of the Nationalmuseum Stockholm
1886 paintings
Swedish paintings